Nodes Point Battery (map reference ) is a battery located at Nodes Point on the Isle of Wight. It is one of the many Palmerston Forts built on the island to protect it in response to a perceived French invasion. Construction of the battery began on 16 August 1901 and was completed by 20 April 1904.

The battery was armed with two 9.2-inch Breech Loading guns and two 6-inch Mark VII Breech loading guns. By 1932 only the two 6-inch guns remained.

From 1949 the battery was used for Territorial Army Coast Artillery training. On the abolition of coast artillery in 1956 the fort was disarmed and the site sold. The remains of the site are now used as a holiday park.

Publications
 
 Moore, David, 2010. The East Wight Defences, Solent Papers Number 10, David Moore, Gosport.

External links
Victorian Forts data sheet

Nodes Point Battery

Forts on the Isle of Wight
Palmerston Forts
Infrastructure completed in 1904
Artillery batteries